The Haval F5 is a compact Crossover sport utility vehicle produced by the Chinese manufacturer Great Wall Motor from 2018 to 2020.

First generation

The Haval F5 was originally previewed by the Haval Concept R shown at the 2015 Shanghai Auto Show alongside the Concept B. The two concepts was intended to show the dual-label design strategy of Haval at the time, with Concept R representing the Red Label line and Concept B representing the Blue Label line, featuring different styling that targets different customers. The Haval Concept R ultimately became the Haval F5 while the Concept B ultimately became the second generation Haval H6 Blue Label.

The production Haval F5 was based on the same platform as the Haval H6 and WEY VV5, with prices ranging from 100,000 yuan to 130,000 yuan.

The Haval F5 is powered by the GW4B15A 1.5 liter inline-4 turbo engine producing 169hp (124 kW) at 5,000-5,600 rpm and 285 Nm of torque at 1,400-3,000 rpm, with the engine mated to a 7-speed wet-type dual-clutch transmission.

Second generation
As of November 2020, patent of the second generation Haval F5 broke out. The second generation model was updated in the same style as the third generation Haval H6 featuring a longer wheelbase and full width tail lamp. The additional potential name is Haval Kuanghuan. The updated model has a length of 4450mm, width of 1841mm, and height of 1618mm, with the wheelbase being 2700mm. The engine of the lower spec model that was seen is the GW4G15K 1.5 liter turbo engine producing 150 hp.

References

F5
Compact sport utility vehicles
Front-wheel-drive vehicles
All-wheel-drive vehicles
2010s cars
Cars of China
Cars introduced in 2018